Ishasha may refer to:

 Ishasha, Democratic Republic of the Congo, a town in North Kivu Province, Democratic Republic of the Congo
 Ishasha River Camp Airport, an airport in Ishasha Sector, Queen Elizabeth National Park, Uganda
 Ishasha River, a river that forms the international border between DR Congo and southwest Uganda
 Ishasha Airport (Democratic Republic of the Congo), an airport
 Ishasha, Uganda, a border crossing point and refugee transit station in Kanungu District, Uganda